Vaughan Smith (born 16 April 1969) is a Zimbabwean freestyle and medley swimmer. He competed in four events at the 1988 Summer Olympics.

References

External links
 

1969 births
Living people
Zimbabwean male freestyle swimmers
Zimbabwean male medley swimmers
Olympic swimmers of Zimbabwe
Swimmers at the 1988 Summer Olympics
African Games bronze medalists for Zimbabwe
African Games medalists in swimming
Place of birth missing (living people)
Competitors at the 1987 All-Africa Games
20th-century Zimbabwean people
21st-century Zimbabwean people